The 8 Metre was a sailing event on the Sailing at the 1912 Summer Olympics program in Nynäshamn.  Two races were scheduled plus eventual sail-off's. 18 sailors, on 6 boats, from 5 nations entered.

Race schedule

Course area and course configuration 
For the 8-Metre Course B was used.

Weather conditions

Final results 
The 1912 Olympic scoring system was used. All competitors were male.

Daily standings

Notes 
In the 8 Metre there was one spare boat:

Other information

Prizes 
The following Commemorative Plaque were handed out by the Royal Swedish Yacht Club to the owners of:

Further reading

References 

Sailing at the 1912 Summer Olympics
8 Metre (keelboat)